Wynsum Corporate Plaza is a 35-storey office skyscraper in Ortigas Center, in Pasig City. The building is equipped with a double glazed curtain wall system for additional energy and efficient cooling complemented by a combination of a polished red granite exterior wall and composite cladding. It also has 11 elevators.

References

Skyscrapers in Ortigas Center
Office buildings completed in 2000
Skyscraper office buildings in Metro Manila